In the video game industry, a battle pass is a type of monetization approach that provides additional content for a game usually through a tiered system, rewarding the player with in-game items for playing the game and completing specific challenges. Inspired by the season pass ticketing system and originating with Dota 2 in 2013, the battle pass model gained more use as an alternative to subscription fees and loot boxes beginning in the late 2010s. Battle passes tend to offer free passes, which are available to all users, and a premium pass that require annual or seasonal charges in exchange for enhanced items and cosmetics.

Concept
Within the video game Fortnite & a few others, a battle pass may be offered free to a player, or may require the player to purchase it through microtransactions. Once obtained, the battle pass presents the player with a number of reward tiers; by earning enough experience to complete the tier, the player gains the rewards offered at that tier. These rewards are typically cosmetic in nature, such as character and weapon customization options (also known as "skins"), emotes, and other non-gameplay affecting elements. More desirable rewards are provided at higher levels, which offer a way for players to show off these unique customization options to other players as a status symbol. Experience is gained through normal gameplay, and often through in-game challenges, while some games offer a way to accelerate progression through a battle pass by using microtransactions. In games that offer both free and paid-for battle passes, the free pass may have a very limited number of tiers or offer fewer or less-desirable rewards, but will track progress of the player's progression through the paid-for battle pass, allowing them to buy that battle pass at any time to reap the rewards.

Battle passes and the rewards contained are only available for a limited time, most commonly a few months, after which a new season battle pass with a new set of rewards are available to be acquired. Most battle pass items are unobtainable after the season ends. This limited availability feeds into the psychological phenomenon of fear of missing out or FOMO, that a player, knowing certain rewards will only be available for a limited time, will be driven to buy and complete the battle pass to assure they have obtained the limited rewards in time, bringing more revenue to the game.  To this end, a battle pass's progression towards rewards has to be balanced against expected gameplay time and what gameplay elements contribute towards this to avoid making the progression feel like grinding. For example, Halo Infinite multiplayer debuted with a battle pass that was criticized for being too slow in progression, which developer 343 Industries stated they would observe and balance in the future.

The debut of Overwatch 2 battle pass system, replacing the previous loot box system, was criticized by players as Blizzard Entertainment stated that new playable heroes would be available through the free tiers of the battle pass, though could be obtained earlier by paying for the premiere battle pass; Blizzard also confirmed that players that miss the free hero during one season would be able to obtain the hero by a free route in future seasons. This was in contrast to Overwatch where all players had access to new heroes for free once they were released. Players considered this change a pay to win approach by Blizzard as well as forcing players to grind to get access to new heroes.

Battle passes may be called different terms depending on the game. For example, Rocket League and PlayerUnknown's Battlegrounds offer a "Rocket Pass" and "Survivor Pass" respectively.

History
One of the first known examples of a battle pass concept was seen in Valve's Dota 2 during an event that surrounded The International 2013, the annual e-sports tournament for the game. Called the "Compendium", it provided unique in-game content and other features for those players that purchased it, with 25% of all revenue made from it going towards the prize pool for the event. In 2016, Valve included the Compendium into the larger International Battle Pass, and later introduced a monthly form of one with their Dota Plus subscription feature in 2018. Valve also added "campaign passes" to Team Fortress 2 with special events in 2015. The campaign pass gave the player that purchased it a number of goals to complete during the event to receive unique customization options.

The popularity of these passes grew significantly in 2018 with the use in Epic Games' Fortnite Battle Royale. Its runaway success on a scale rarely seen before drew great interest towards its monetization methods. The free-to-play game adopted a "season"-driven release schedule, each season lasting about 10-20 weeks, during which a new set of cosmetic items and emotes were offered. The newly coined "Battle Pass" was added starting in its second season, during a time when the game was seeing a large growth in its player base and has been used by the game since. Battle passes are purchased through an in-game currency called V-Bucks, which either must be purchased with real-world funds via microtransactions, or earned via Fortnite: Save the World, as well as through the battle pass itself. With expansion of Fortnite to mobile devices in March 2018, revenue estimates from the game were in the hundreds of millions of dollars per month in the following months, primarily from battle pass sales.

At the same time as Fortnite was becoming a success, the video game industry had been dealing with the issue of loot boxes, another monetization scheme where players spend funds to open boxes containing a random assortment of in-game items. In the late 2010s, loot boxes faced scrutiny from several government-related groups, believing they encouraged gambling, particularly for young players. Battle passes were then seen as a preferable option to loot boxes, as players would be able to see all the rewards they could earn, even if they needed to spend a great deal of time completing all the tiers, assuring players continued to play the game. Further, by offering the means for players to buy into completing tiers, publishers could also see additional revenue.

Coupled with the success of Fortnite battle pass approach and exhaustion over loot box controversies, other publishers started to evaluate battle pass use, with gaming journalists theorizing that games which formerly relied on loot boxes or worked as a service could begin to offer battle passes as a replacement. An increasing number of mobile games including but not limited to Call of Duty Mobile, PUBG Mobile, Clash Royale, Clash of Clans, and Brawl Stars have started using the battle pass system in their games. Some games, such as Super Animal Royale and Halo Infinite, use non-expiring battle passes, where old battle passes remain purchasable and usable even after their respective season ends, but only one pass may be enabled at a time. Deep Rock Galactic distributes items from seasonal passes into other cosmetic pools when the season concludes so that players are able to access cosmetics even after it has ended.

References

Business models
Video game terminology
Video game distribution
2010s neologisms